The Hong Kong Film Award for Best Actor  is an annual Hong Kong industry award presented to an actor for the best performance by an actor in a leading role. The actor with most awards in this category is Tony Leung Chiu-Wai with 5 times. He is also holding the record for actor with most awards in the Best Supporting Actor category.

History
The award was established at the 1st Hong Kong Film Awards (1982) and the first winner and the sole participant in this category was Michael Hui for his role in the film Security Unlimited. From the 2nd Hong Kong Film Awards (1983), there are 5, sometimes 6, nominations for the category of Best Actor from which one actor is chosen the winner of the Hong Kong Film Award for Best Actor, except the 2nd Awards when Sammo Hung and Karl Maka shared the award. The most recent recipient of the award was Anthony Wong, who was honoured at the 38th Hong Kong Film Awards (2019), for his performance in Still Human.

The actor with most awards in this category is Tony Leung Chiu-Wai with five wins. He also holds the record for the actor with the most awards in the Best Supporting Actor category. Jackie Chan holds the record for an actor with the most nominations without ever winning, until the 24th Hong Kong Film Awards (2005) he was nominated 10 times without a single award.

Winners and nominees

Multiple wins and nominations

The following individuals received two or more Best Actor awards:

The following individuals received five or more Best Actor nominations:

Records

See also 
 Hong Kong Film Award
 Hong Kong Film Award for Best Actress
 Hong Kong Film Award for Best Supporting Actor
 Hong Kong Film Award for Best Supporting Actress
 Hong Kong Film Award for Best Action Choreography
 Hong Kong Film Award for Best Cinematography
 Hong Kong Film Award for Best Director
 Hong Kong Film Award for Best Film
 Hong Kong Film Award for Best New Performer

References

External links
 Hong Kong Film Awards Official Site

Film awards for lead actor
Hong Kong Film Awards
Awards established in 1982